The eighth running of the Tour of Flanders cycling classic was held on Tuesday, 23 March 1924. Belgian track specialist Gerard Debaets won the race after a solo breakaway. René Vermandel and Felix Sellier completed the podium. 17 of 63 riders finished.

Route
The race started and finished in Ghent – totaling 284 km. The course featured two categorized climbs:
 Tiegemberg
 Kwaremont

Results

References

Tour of Flanders
1924 in road cycling
1924 in Belgian sport
March 1924 sports events